State Highway 109 (abbreviated SH-109 or OK-109) is a 54 mile (87 km) long state highway in southern Oklahoma. It runs through southern Choctaw County, connecting to US-70 at each end. It has no lettered spur routes.

Route description
The highway begins heading southbound from US-70 at Boswell. It turns westbound after about 5 miles (8 km). As it approaches the Red River, it turns back northward and then eastward again to run through unincorporated Gay, 24 miles (38.6 km) into the route. Six miles (9.65 km) later, it meets U.S. Highway 271 and has a concurrency with it lasting about 4 miles (6.4 km), splitting off near Ord. Between Frogville and Huskey it turns back north before ending at US-70 near Fort Towson.

History
SH-109 originally ran from Fort Towson to Raymond Gary State Park. However, on 1957-04-23 it was redesignated to run from Boswell to Fort Towson. It was realigned several times in the 1960s and once in 1982. Since 1982, the route has remained unchanged.

Junction list

References

External links

SH-109 at Roadklahoma

109
Transportation in Choctaw County, Oklahoma